The Journal of Pharmaceutical Sciences is a monthly peer-reviewed scientific journal published by Elsevier on behalf of the American Pharmacists Association, with the support of the International Pharmaceutical Federation. It is also published simultaneously by Wiley. It deals with the science of pharmacology and related biotechnology (the official journal of the association, dealing with the practice of pharmacy,  is the Journal of the American Pharmacists Association)

The journal was first published in 1912, as The Journal of the American Pharmaceutical Association, which covered both general and scientific topics. It was published as a separate edition, Journal of the American Pharmaceutical Association (Scientific ed.) from 1940 to 1960. It adopted its present title in 1961. The editor-in-chief is Ronald T. Borchardt (University of Kansas).

According to the Journal Citation Reports the journal has a 2014 impact factor of 2.59, ranking it 109th out of 254 journals in the category "Pharmacology & Pharmacy.

References

External links

Elsevier academic journals
Pharmacology journals
Publications established in 1912
1912 establishments in the United States
Pharmacy in the United States
Monthly journals